Kenfig is a village and former borough in Bridgend, Wales. To the west lies Port Talbot, at approximately 7 miles, and Swansea at approximately 18 miles.

Geography

The area of sand dunes and the pool at Kenfig are managed by Bridgend County Borough Council as Kenfig Pool National Nature Reserve, the area designated a Site of Special Scientific Interest. The reserve has a visitor and interpretation centre, and a car park. The dunes are home to a variety of rare and endangered species of plants and animals, including a high concentration of fen orchid (or Liparis loeselii). It makes up part of the largest active sand dune system in Europe. The current village, built further inland, is a continuation of the mediaeval one. Landmarks include ruins of Kenfig Castle, and a natural pool which attracts birdwatchers. It is one of the few places in Britain where the bittern can be seen during the winter.

The Kenfig Burrows beach is used by naturists.

Kenfig is close to Margam, Pyle, North Cornelly, South Cornelly and Porthcawl.

History
The village was established in the 12th century and was situated around Kenfig Castle. The encroaching sand caused by intensive cattle grazing and declining temperature due to the Medieval Warm Period made habitation of the area difficult and by the 14th century most of the fields and buildings were unusable. The village was abandoned by 1650. The church was moved from the original village stone by stone and currently stands in the village of Pyle, where the relocation is evident by smaller stones at the bottom of the church, with larger ones above.  All that remains now of Kenfig Castle is covered by the sand dunes, except for the top of its 50-foot keep which was uncovered in the early 20th century. The earlier settlement was the subject of an episode of the archaeological television programme Time Team, screened on 11 March 2012.

The borough contributed with other Glamorgan towns to sending a member of parliament to Westminster until the Reform Act of 1832. The municipal ceremonial mace is in the National Museum of Wales but a pewter copy is held in the Prince of Wales, a pub and Grade II-listed inn, which was built in the 1400s and over the years has served as town hall, courthouse, and a mortuary for sailors whose bodies washed ashore on nearby beaches.

In 1940, work commenced on a calcium carbide plant at Kenfig, built for the Ministry of Supply and operated by British Industrial Solvents, a subsidiary of the Distillers Company. Calcium carbide was a vital raw material for acetylene production. The Kenfig plant closed in 1966, overtaken by cheaper methods of producing acetylene from the catalytic cracking of oil and foreign competitors lower electricity costs.

In 1968, BorgWarner opened a plant at Kenfig for the manufacture of automatic transmissions.   In January 1976 the plant completed its two millionth gearbox, which was 'presented' to A B Volvo.   At that time a press release stated that Borg-Warner's UK plants at Letchworth and at Kenfig were producing transmissions for use in more than fifty different car models, and that more than half the gearboxes produced were exported outside the UK. In 2001 the factory faced the threat of closure but was saved by a new contract from Korean car company Kia.  In December 2008 Borg-Warner announced that the plant would finally close by mid-2010 with the loss of all 110 jobs at the site; a statement from the company blamed the economic downturn for the decision.

In 2009, two Grob Tutor T1 aircraft collided in mid-air and crashed in the nature reserve, killing both pilots and two teenage air cadets.

In literature

Kenfig local legend, folklore, and Sker House inspired the novel The Maid of Sker by R. D. Blackmore.

See also
 Cynffig, a former local government community
 Kenfig Pool
 River Kenfig

References

External links
"History of Kenfig and surrounding areas", Kenfig.org.uk
"Kenfig Through the Ages", Weebly.com
"Abandoned Communities ..... Kenfig", Abandonedcommunities.co.uk
"Kenfig, Bridgend", Geograph.co.uk
"Time Team Episode", Channel4.com

Villages in Bridgend County Borough
Former populated places in Wales
Nude beaches
12th-century establishments in Wales